HKS, Inc. is an American international architecture firm headquartered in Dallas, Texas (USA).

History 
The firm was founded in 1939 by Harwood K. Smith.

In 2002,  HKS expanded its international presence by opening HKS Arquitectos in Mexico City to serve its Latin American clients.

In 2006, HKS acquired the Stein-Cox Group and Trinity Design to have presences in Phoenix, Arizona and Detroit, Michigan, respectively.

In 2007, HKS expanded their hospitality architectural design services and also acquired the hospitality design firm Hill Glazier Architects, located in Palo Alto, California.  The firm also opened offices in Miami, Nashville, Oklahoma City, and Chennai, India.

HKS expanded its global presence in 2008 opening offices in Abu Dhabi and São Paulo, Brazil and again in 2010 with an office in Shanghai, China.

In 2008 HKS acquired that part of the Ryder HKS joint venture it did not already own.

In 2010 HKS announced the formation of a nonprofit architectural research group, Center for Advanced Design and Evaluation.

In 2011 HKS saw rapid expansion.  In October HKS released an announcement it had acquired the interior design firm Maregatti Interiors LLC in Indianapolis. The HKS Science & Technology Practice was formed after the firm acquired Earl Walls Studios in San Diego, California.  HKS also opened new locations in Chicago, Denver, New York, and New Delhi, India.

In 2012 HKS announced the acquisition of Miami-headquartered educational design firm HADP Architecture, Inc.

In 2014 HKS launched a year-long public campaign to commemorate the firm's 75th anniversary.

In 2017, HKS expanded its footprint with the acquisition of a New York City Design Studio.

Services
As of 2015, the firm employs more than 1000 people, making it one of the largest architectural firms in the United States and has completed services on structures valued in excess of $69 billion, with more than $12 billion of construction currently underway.

Notable Projects

This list includes projects in which HKS collaborated with other architecture firms.
 Orlando Health/Orlando Regional Medical Center, Orlando, Florida
 SoFi Stadium, Inglewood, California
 AT&T Stadium, Arlington, Texas
 Bass Hall, Fort Worth, Texas
 U.S. Bank Stadium, Minneapolis, Minnesota
 FAU Stadium, Boca Raton, Florida
 Phoenix Children's Hospital, Phoenix, Arizona
 University of Texas MD Anderson Cancer Center, Houston, Texas
 Globe Life Field, Arlington, Texas
 Mosaic Stadium, Regina, Saskatchewan
 Bank of America Corporate Center, Charlotte, North Carolina
 Apogee Stadium, Denton, Texas
 College Park Center, Arlington, Texas
 American Airlines Center, Dallas, Texas
 Globe Life Park in Arlington, Arlington, Texas
 Atlantis Paradise Island, The Bahamas
 Children's Medical Center (Dallas), Dallas, Texas
 Dallas/Fort Worth International Airport Terminal D (International Terminal), Dallas–Fort Worth, Texas
 Dell Diamond, Round Rock, Texas
 Dr Pepper Ballpark, Frisco, Texas
 Horner Ballpark at Dallas Baptist University, Dallas, Texas
 Toyota Stadium (Texas), Frisco, Texas
 Banner Island Ballpark, Stockton, California
 Lucas Oil Stadium, Indianapolis, Indiana
 Lone Star Park, Grand Prairie, Texas
 Miller Park, Milwaukee, Wisconsin
 Mosaic Stadium, Regina, Saskatchewan
 The Palazzo, Las Vegas, Nevada
 RadioShack Campus, Fort Worth, Texas
 Ritz-Carlton, Dallas, Texas
 Amon G. Carter Stadium, Fort Worth, Texas (renovations to existing facility)
 JCPenney Corporate Headquarters, Plano, Texas
 W Dallas Victory Hotel and Residences – Victory Park, Dallas, Texas
 U.S. Census Bureau Headquarters, Suitland, Maryland
 Venetian Macao, Macau, China
 Whole Foods Market Headquarters, Austin, Texas
 Winchester Medical Center, Winchester, Virginia
 Stanley Park Stadium for Liverpool F.C., Liverpool, England (planned)
 Club Santos Laguna, Nuevo Estadio Corona, Torreón, Coahuila, Mexico
 Guaranteed Rate Field, Chicago, Illinois (2001–2007 renovations)
 The Administration building, University of Texas Health Science Center at San Antonio, San Antonio, Texas
 Uni-Trade Stadium, Laredo, Texas
 311 South Wacker Drive, Chicago, Illinois
 Energy Center, New Orleans, Louisiana
 Es Con Field Hokkaido, Kitahiroshima, Hokkaido, Japan

References

External links
 Official website

Companies based in Dallas
Architecture firms based in Texas
Design companies established in 1939